"I Get Around" is a song by American rapper 2Pac from his second studio album, Strictly 4 My N.I.G.G.A.Z... (1993). It was released on June 10, 1993 as the album's second single and features Shakur's mentor Shock G and Money-B of Digital Underground, Shakur's old group. It was produced by Shock G, who produced it under the alias, The D-Flow Production Squad. AllMusic notes that in the song Shakur "brags about his sexual conquests". Chart-wise, it was the album's most successful single reaching number eleven on the Billboard Hot 100 charts.

Composition and writing
In the 2009 book How to Rap, Shock G recalled that Shakur wrote the lyrics to the beat after hearing it for a while (rather than with no beat), and that Shakur also ghostwrote Shock G's verse.

Commercial success
"I Get Around" peaked at number 11 on the US Billboard Hot 100. It spent 25 weeks on the charts and peaked number 5 on the US R&B charts. It was certified gold by the Recording Industry Association of America (RIAA) and sold 900,000 copies.

Track listing

12"
 "I Get Around" (LP version) – 4:19
 "I Get Around" (vocal version) – 6:07
 "Nothing but Love" – 5:04
 "I Get Around" (remix) – 6:06
 "I Get Around" (remix instrumental) – 6:04
 "I Get Around" (7" remix) – 3:36

12"
 "I Get Around" (remix) – 6:06
 "I Get Around" (7" remix) – 3:36
 "Holler If Ya Hear Me" (Broadway mix) – 4:31
 "Flex" (featuring: Dramacydal) – 4:19
12"
 "I Get Around" (LP version) – 4:19
 "Keep Ya Head Up" (radio version) – 4:25
 "Keep Ya Head Up" (LP version) – 4:25
 "I Get Around" (radio version) – 4:19

CD
 "I Get Around" (LP version) – 4:19
 "I Get Around" (7" remix) – 3:36
CD
 "I Get Around" (extra clean version) – 4:19

Charts

Weekly charts

Year-end charts

Certifications

References

External links
Music video

1992 songs
1993 singles
Tupac Shakur songs
Dirty rap songs
G-funk songs
Interscope Records singles
Songs written by Tupac Shakur
Songs written by Larry Troutman
Songs about casual sex
Songs written by Shirley Murdock
Music videos directed by David Dobkin
Songs written by Shock G